Luke Whitlatch (born 1977, Casper, Wyoming) is an American, Asheville North Carolina-based, artist. His paintings have been shown in Los Angeles, New York City, and Wyoming.  His work has been reviewed in Modern Painters and the Columbia Art and Literature Review.

Whitlatch grew up in Wyoming before moving to Los Angeles to study art at Otis College of Art and Design, where he received a BFA in 2001.

Selected solo exhibitions 
 2021 "Do you call day night?" solo show, Tracey Morgan Gallery Asheville, North Carolina
 2018 “Here lies the void I once knew” solo show, Scarlow's Gallery Casper, Wyoming 
 2013 “Hand of the Slumber Man,” solo show, Richard Heller Gallery, Santa Monica, California
 2010 “Ghost in the cargo van,” solo show, Corridor Gallery, Casper, Wyoming
 2008 “The Goodstein Incidents,” solo show, Bandini Art, Culver City, California
 2004 “The Confines of Expressionism,” solo show, Timbrespace, Los Angeles, California

Selected group exhibitions 
 2019 "A Consuming Fire (with Eric Anderson); Keystone Gallery, Los Angeles, California
 2018 “It’s OK,” group show, Charlie James Gallery Los Angeles, California, Curated by Sacha Baumann
 2014 "6018 Wilshire Blvd." group show, Edward Cella Gallery Los Angeles, California, Curated by Carl Berg

References

External links 
 Artillery Magazine, "A Consuming Fire", Paintings by Eric Anderson and Luke Whitlatch Keystone Gallery, Los Angeles Press Release
 Anp Quarterly V2 #4 (Biploar Bear mention)
 Keystone Artspace, A Consuming Fire: Eric Anderson and Luke Whitlatch
 Chaos and Frenzy. Fantasy and Whimsy: This Artweek.LA, by Bill Bush
 Luke Whitlatch's website
 Cargo Collective, Luke Whitlatch

American male painters
21st-century American painters
21st-century American male artists
20th-century American painters
1977 births
Living people
Otis College of Art and Design alumni
Artists from Wyoming
Artists from Los Angeles
People from Casper, Wyoming
20th-century American male artists